Taloda is a historical city and a municipal council in Nandurbar district located in the Khandesh region of Indian state of Maharashtra. The city is surrounded by beautiful river and mountains.

Brief History
Taloda was originally ruled by Rajput chieftains, till 1631, when it was granted by the Rajput king to the Bargals.
Taloda (Talode) is a Tehsil with mountain range of Satpuda on its north side and river Tapti on the Southern Side. King Shivaji sacked city of Surat, on their journey, his forces used to halt (tal in Marathi)  on the banks of Tapi river. It has given a unique identity to this area and the name to the town - as a place for halt.

The oldest monument of that period is the castle known as Bargalanchi Gadhi. It is one of the testimonies of the early construction of that era. In 1662, Jahagirdar Bhojraj Bargal a Dhangar-Maratha Sardar in the army of the Peshwas commenced the construction of this castle, on a land of around 6 acres, and it took approximately 5 years for the complete construction.

Sardar Malhar Rao Holkar, the nephew and son in law of Bhojraj Bargal spent a major part of his childhood here. Construction of many temples can be found in the vicinity. Bhojraj Bargal's descendants continued to live in the fortress of Taloda, while a major chunk now lives in Indore to manage the family Estates.

Taloda also witnesses the Ashwatthama Yatra every year, where people from different sects (women not allowed due to religious beliefs) hike across the Satpuda Mountains to visit Ashwatthama's resting abode since it is a popular belief that he is still alive and will be so till the end of time.

Geography 
Taloda is located near Tapi river which is also known as Tapti river in south India. In the north of Taloda, the Satpuda mountain range is situated. City has an average elevation of 366 metres (1200 feet).

Demographics
 India census, Taloda had a population of 25,036. Males constitute 51% of the population and females 49%. Taloda has an average literacy rate of 60%, higher than the national average of 59.5%: male literacy is 68%, and female literacy is 52%. In Taloda, 13% of the population is under 6 years of age. First municipal corporation of maharastra is in taloda city 1867. Local tribal language bhilu ( ladshi dogari, bayadi etc... ) is most spoken language here and people spoke also  Ahirani (a variety of Marathi) and Gujarati.

Transport 
As National Highway 753B ( NH 753B ) passes through Taloda, it is well connected with state transport buses & private buses. Nearest railway station from Taloda is Nandurbar railway station which is situated just 17.7 km away. While Surat Airport which is located 193.2 km away from the city is the closest airport.

Notable Historical Families

-  Jahagirdar Bargal family's

Shrimant Amarjeetrao raje Bargal & their family members.

-  Shrimant Rana family of Pratappur, Talode (Sr)

Rana Yagyadevsingh

-  Shrimant Rana family of Gopalpur, Talode (Jr)

Rana Kirtikumar

-  Shrimaan Thakurrao Rana

Raosaheb Dadashri Dr. Onkarsingji

References

Cities and towns in Nandurbar district
Talukas in Maharashtra